Chachiot is a former Vidhan Sabha constituency and a tehsil in Mandi District of Himachal Pradesh.

References

 http://www.himachal.nic.in

Geography of Mandi district
Tehsils of Himachal Pradesh